Sarucallis is a genus of aphids in the family Aphididae. There is one described species in Sarucallis, S. kahawaluokalani.

References

Further reading

 
 

Sternorrhyncha genera
Articles created by Qbugbot
Panaphidini